Michael Jackson's Private Home Movies is a two-hour television special that premiered on FOX on April 24, 2003. The premiere was watched by 7.9 million viewers. The show provides "never-before-seen footage revealing his real life, family, and friends."

Cast
 Michael Jackson 
 Kieran Culkin (archive footage)
 Macaulay Culkin	
 Jackie Jackson (archive footage)
 Janet Jackson (archive footage)
 Jermaine Jackson (archive footage)
 Marlon Jackson (archive footage)
 Tito Jackson (archive footage)
 Michael Jordan (archive footage)
 John Landis (archive footage)
 Emmanuel Lewis
 Maia Newley
 Princess Diana (archive footage)
 Brooke Shields
 Elizabeth Taylor (archive footage)
 Chris Tucker

Reception

Viewership
On its premiere airing, the special was watched by 7.9 million viewers.

References

External links

2000s American television specials
American documentary films
Documentary films about Michael Jackson